L. Fallon Kelly (September 13, 1907 – June 19, 1992) was a justice of the Minnesota Supreme Court from July 6, 1970 to July 6, 1980. He also served as United States Attorney for Minnesota during the Eisenhower administration.

References

Justices of the Minnesota Supreme Court
1907 births
1992 deaths
20th-century American judges